Hesychotypa colombiana is a species of beetle in the family Cerambycidae. It was described by Martins and Galileo in 1990. It is known from Ecuador and Colombia.

References

colombiana
Beetles described in 1990